Osieck  is a village in Otwock County, Masovian Voivodeship, in east-central Poland. It is the seat of the gmina (administrative district) called Gmina Osieck.

The village has a population of 920.

On June 4, 1981, a collision between two trains occurred near Osieck, killing 25 people.

External links
 Jewish Community in Osieck on Virtual Shtetl

References

Osieck
Masovian Voivodeship (1526–1795)
Siedlce Governorate
Lublin Governorate
Lublin Voivodeship (1919–1939)
Warsaw Voivodeship (1919–1939)